A bedroom is a residential room used for sleeping.

Bedroom(s) or The Bedroom may also refer to:

Film and television
Bedrooms (film), a 2010 American film by Youssef Delara
Bedroom (film), a 2012 Bengali film
Bedroom TV, a defunct British music channel

Paintings
The Bedroom (Karlsruhe), a 1658–1660 oil by Pieter de Hooch
The Bedroom (Widener Collection), a 1658–1660 oil by Pieter de Hooch
The Bedroom (Van Gogh) or Bedroom in Arles, three similar 1888–1889 paintings by Vincent van Gogh

Songs
"Bedroom", by Ball Park Music from Ball Park Music, 2020
"Bedroom", by John Cale from Process, 2005
"Bedroom", by JJ Lin featuring Anne-Marie, 2021
"Bedroom", by Mabel, 2017
"Bedroom", by Sarge from Charcoal, 1996

See also